"Just Have a Heart" is a song recorded by American R&B singer Angela Clemmons for her second studio album, This Is Love (1987). It was written by Aldo Nova, Billy Steinberg and Ralph McCarthy, and produced by Nova. Later, it was covered by Canadian singer Celine Dion.

Celine Dion version

In 1987, Celine Dion recorded a French-language version of "Just Have a Heart," titled "Partout je te vois" for her album Incognito. In 1990, the English-language version of the song, titled "Have a Heart" was included on Dion's first English-language studio album, Unison. It was released as the fifth, but promotional only, single in Canada on 8 July 1991.

Background and release
In 1987, Dion recorded French-language version of "Just Have a Heart" (titled "Partout je te vois") with words by Eddy Marnay and included it on her album, Incognito. Dion performed the original English-language version at the Juno Awards of 1987. Her well-received performance allowed her to gain a bigger budget to create her first English-language album, Unison (1990). Dion also recorded the English-language version of the song for this album. It was produced by David Foster and titled "Have a Heart". Thanks to this song, Foster was nominated for the Juno Award for Producer of the Year in 1991. Dion released "Have a Heart" as the fifth and last single from Unison in Canada in July 1991.

Critical reception
Christopher Smith from TalkAboutPopMusic described the song as an "epic, slow number, perfect for spending those last few minutes of the night with someone special."

Commercial performance
In Canada, "Have a Heart" entered the RPM Top Singles chart on 13 July 1991 and peaked at number 26 on 14 September 1991. The song also entered the RPM Adult Contemporary chart on 6 July 1991 and reached number four there on 31 August 1991.

Live performances
Dion performed "Have a Heart" for the very first time at the Juno Awards of 1987. She also sang it during her Unison Tour in 1990 and 1991. The live performance of "Have a Heart," recorded at the Winter Garden Theatre in Toronto, Ontario, Canada was included on the Unison home video.

Track listings and formats
Canadian promotional CD single
"Have a Heart" – 4:14

Charts

Weekly charts

Year-end charts

Credits and personnel
Recording
Recorded at Chartmaker Studios, Malibu
Mixed at Lion Share Studio, Los Angeles

Personnel

Celine Dion – lead vocals
David Foster – producer, arranger, keyboards
Aldo Nova – songwriter, arranger
Billy Steinberg – songwriter
Ralph McCarthy – songwriter
Robbie Buchanan – keyboards, synth programming
Randy Kerber – keyboards, synth programming
Rick Bowen – synth programming
Jeff Porcaro – drums
Michael Landau – guitar
Humberto Gatica – engineer, mix
Jeffrey Woodruff – engineer
David Reitzas – assistant engineer
Laura Livingston – assistant mix engineer

References

External links

1987 songs
1991 singles
Celine Dion songs
Columbia Records singles
Song recordings produced by David Foster
Songs written by Aldo Nova
Songs written by Billy Steinberg